{{Infobox football club
| clubname = Martos CD
| image = File:Martos_CD_logo.png
| fullname = Martos Club Deportivo
| nickname = 
| founded = 1970
| ground = Estadio Municipal Ciudad de Martos Martos, Spain
| capacity = 5,000
| manager = Fernando Campos
| league = División de Honor Andaluza – Group 2
| season = 2021–22
| position = Primera andaluza Jaén (B), 2nd(promoted)| website = 
| pattern_la1 = _redlower
| pattern_b1 = _redarc
| pattern_ra1 = _redlower
| pattern_sh1 = 
| pattern_so1 = 
| leftarm1 = FF0000
| body1 = FFFFFF
| rightarm1 = FF0000
| shorts1 = FFFFFF
| socks1 = FFFFFF
| pattern_la2 = _whitelower
| pattern_b2 = _whitearc
| pattern_ra2 = _whitelower
| leftarm2 = FF0000
| body2 = FF0000
| rightarm2 = FF0000
| shorts2 = FF0000
| socks2 = FF0000
| current = 
}}Martos Club Deportivo is a Spanish football club, founded in 1970 and based in Martos. The club competes in División de Honor Andaluza, holding home games at the Estadio Municipal Ciudad de Martos, with a capacity of 5,000 people. It's considered a traditional team in the province of Jaén and the Tercera División, as it has played 32 seasons in this category and have played more than 1.200 matches.

Season to season32''' seasons in Tercera División

References

External links
 
La Preferente team profile 
Soccerway team profile

Football clubs in Andalusia
Association football clubs established in 1970
1970 establishments in Spain
Province of Jaén (Spain)